The Committee for a Workers' International (CWI) is an international association of Trotskyist political parties. The organisation considers itself a continuation of the Committee for a Workers' International that was founded in 1974.

History 

In 2018 and 2019, a dispute developed in around the questions of socialism and identity politics, the role of the trade unions and the working-class movement, and under what programme and how should Marxists organise internationally and domestically, which ultimately led to multifaceted split. The dispute divided the leading bodies of the CWI with International Secretariat and International Executive Committee taking conflicting positions.

One group founded the “In Defence of a Working Class and Trotskyist CWI” (IDWCTCWI) faction in November 2018 in support of the CWI's International Secretariat.

A Special Conference of the Socialist Party (England and Wales) voted by a margin of 173 to 35 to support the faction and sponsor the international faction conference. This conference was held in July 2019, open only to CWI members who supported the faction, and asserted that they had refounded the CWI.

A second group, in support of the majority of the CWI's International Executive Committee, declared itself the CWI Majority in August 2019 and renamed their organisation International Socialist Alternative on 1 February 2020. It asserted that  the IDWCTCWI had split from the CWI.

The CWI has published what it considers to be the main documents which were produced during the debate. The ISA have produced its own analysis which accuses the CWI leadership of being ossified, and embarking on a bureaucratic rampage

Sections

References

External links

Committee for a Workers' International
Trotskyist political internationals